Galanovrysi is a village and a community of the Elassona municipality. Before 1927 the village was known as Aradosivia Orta Mahale(Greek: Αραδοσίβια Ορτά).Until the exchange of populations in 1924 and the arrival of the refugees from Pontus, the village was inhabited by local Greeks and local Muslims. Before the 2011 local government reform it was part of the municipality of Elassona, of which it was a municipal district. The 2011 census recorded 428 inhabitants in the village. The community of Galanovrysi covers an area of 13.831 km2.

Population
According to the 2011 census, the population of Galanovrysi was 428 people, a decrease of almost 17% compared to that of the previous census of 2001.

See also
 List of settlements in the Larissa regional unit

References

Populated places in Larissa (regional unit)